Khaled Mohammed Isa Al-Zylaeei (16 May 1987 – 30 September 2022) was a Saudi Arabian association footballer who played as a winger. He joined Al-Nassr coming from Abha in the summer of 2009 to 2016 and achieved three titles with Al-Nassr. In June 2020, he was diagnosed with amyotrophic lateral sclerosis, and died in September 2022, at the age of 35.

Honours
Al-Nassr
Saudi Professional League: 2013–14, 2014–15
Saudi Crown Prince Cup: 2013–14

Abha
MS League: 2018–19

References

External links
 

1987 births
2022 deaths
People from Abha
Saudi Arabian footballers
Association football midfielders
Saudi First Division League players
Saudi Professional League players
Abha Club players
Al Nassr FC players
Al-Taawoun FC players
Al-Raed FC players
Al-Faisaly FC players
Al Batin FC players
Al-Ain FC (Saudi Arabia) players
Deaths from motor neuron disease